Captain Apache is a 1971 Spanish-British acid Western film directed by Alexander Singer and starring Lee Van Cleef, Carroll Baker, and Stuart Whitman. It was written and produced by Milton Sperling and Philip Yordan. The film was based on the 1965 novel Captain Apache by Sidney Edgerton Whitman, a prolific writer of Western fiction. The vocals of the opening and credits song were written by Dolores Claman and performed by Van Cleef.

Synopsis
Captain Apache is a Native American U.S. Cavalry officer, who finds himself tangled into a conspiracy, and proceeding upon the case of solving the enigma of the last words of a dead commissioner (and captain′s old friend) which were: "April morning". Each time he nears discovering the meaning of the phrase, another character capable of providing certain help in solving the mystery dies and throws him off the trail. The journey eventually takes the captain to a train, one which pulls a private railroad car named April Morning, transporting President Ulysses S. Grant. Putting the information together leads the captain to realizing an assassination is about to take place and he is the only one who can prevent it.

Cast
 Lee Van Cleef – Captain Apache
 Carroll Baker – Maude
 Stuart Whitman – Griffin
 Percy Herbert – Moon
 Elisa Montés – Rosita
 Charly Bravo – Sanchez
 Charles Stal Maker – O'Rourke
 Tony Vogel – Snake
 Faith Clift – Abigail
 Dee Pollock – Ben
 Dan van Husen – Al
 Hugh McDermott – General Ryland
 Elsa Zabala – Witch

Release
Captain Apache was also released under these titles:  Capitán Apache (Spain), Deathwork (U.S.A.), The Guns of April Morning (U.K.), Capitan Apache (Italy), Kapteeni Apassi (Finland), Pääpiru (Finland), O Keravnos ton Apache (Greece), and Hunt the Man Down.

References

External links
 
 Captain Apache at Spaghetti-Western.net

1971 films
1971 Western (genre) films
British Western (genre) films
Spanish Western (genre) films
Films based on American novels
Films based on Western (genre) novels
Films shot in Almería
Films directed by Alexander Singer
English-language Spanish films
1970s English-language films
1970s British films
Acid Westerns